Ashan Kumar is a former Indian professional Kabaddi player and Coach of Tamil Thalaivas. Kumar was the Indian captain of the first Asian Games gold medal-winning team.in recognition of his achievements in the sport, he was awarded the Arjuna Award by the Government of India and Dronacharya Award in 2021. Presently he is the coach of the Indian Kabaddi team.

Early life 
Ashan Kumar was born on 15 April 1960, Bhera village, in the Bhiwani district of Haryana. He took up Kabaddi  during his school days. After having played for his school team, he represented India at the frist Asian games as a captain in 1990.

Career 

The Indian Kabaddi team under Kumar's captaincy won the gold medal in the Asian Games in 1990. At the 64th Kabaddi Senior Nationals, Ashan Kumar was the coach of the Haryana squad, who advanced to the tournament's semifinals. He received the prestigious Arjuna Award from the then-President of India in 1999, the Bhim Award from the governor of Haryana in 1994, and the Bharat Gaurav Award from the president of the AKFI in 1993.As a coach, Asan Sangwan has been the coach of India in 1998 in his coaching team India won gold medal in bangkok.In 2010, he was coach of the Iran team that competed and won silver at Guangzhou. He was also coach of South Korea in 2018. Kumar is currently the head coach of Tamil Thalaivas in the Pro Kabaddi League, as well as the coach of the Indian Kabaddi team.

References 

Living people
Indian kabaddi players
1960 births
Asian Games medalists in kabaddi
Asian Games gold medalists for India
Medalists at the 1990 Asian Games
South Asian Games gold medalists for India
South Asian Games medalists in kabaddi
Recipients of the Arjuna Award
People from Bhiwani district